The 1953 Svenska Cupen final took place on 26 July 1953 at Råsunda in Solna. It was contested between Allsvenskan sides Malmö FF and IFK Norrköping. IFK Norrköping played their first final since 1945 and fourth final in total, Malmö FF played their second consecutive final and their sixth final in total. Malmö FF won their fifth title with a 3–2 victory.

Match details

External links
Svenska Cupen at svenskfotboll.se

Cup
1953
Malmö FF matches
IFK Norrköping matches
Football in Stockholm
July 1953 sports events in Europe